Arcangeli is an Italian surname. Notable people with the surname include:

Angela Arcangeli (born 1991), Italian basketball player
Chiara Arcangeli (born 1983), Italian female volleyball player
Giovanni Arcangeli (1840–1921), Italian botanist
Domiziano Arcangeli  (born 1968), Italian-American actor, producer and writer
Francesco Arcangeli (1737–1768), Italian cook and criminal
Luigi Arcangeli (1902–1931), Italian motorcycle racer
Telemaco Arcangeli (1923–1998),Italian racewalker

Italian-language surnames